Frederick Herman Korth (September 9, 1909 – September 14, 1998) served as the 56th U.S. Secretary of the Navy during 1962–63; he was also an Assistant Secretary of the Army in 1952–53.

Appointed as Navy Secretary by President John F. Kennedy on January 4, 1962, Korth resigned October 14, 1963 effective November 1, 1963. Various sources cite different reasons for Secretary Korth's departure.

Life and career
Korth was born in September 1909 in Yorktown, Texas, the son of Eleanor Maria (Stark) and Fritz R. J. Korth, who was a banker and rancher. In later life, he lived in Coronado Country Club Estates, El Paso, Texas and Foxhall, Washington, D.C.

He was president of the Continental National Bank of Fort Worth, Texas. Continental National Bank was one of a number of banks which participated in a line of credit for the TFX (Tactical Fighter Experimental), which later emerged as the more well-known F-111 Aardvark. When asked about this alleged conflict of interest at a press conference, President Kennedy responded, "...I have no evidence that Mr. Korth acted in any way improperly in the TFX matter....I have no evidence that Mr. Korth benefited improperly during his term of office in the Navy, and I have no evidence, and you have not, as I understand the press has not produced any, nor the McClellan Committee, which would indicate that in any way he acted improperly in the TFX. I have always believed that innuendoes should be justified before they are made, either by me and the Congress, or even in the press." A commentary in the May, 1985 edition of Proceedings magazine exonerates Korth for any improprieties relating to the awarding of TFX.

When he was not serving in the above public or private sector capacities, Fred Korth was a lawyer in private practice. One of his better known cases was a small one heard June 24, 1948 in the County of Tarrant, Texas, when his client, Edwin A. Ekdahl, was officially divorced from Marguerite Frances Claverie Ekdahl (also known as Marguerite Oswald), whose son from a previous marriage was Lee Harvey Oswald. Following the end of Korth's first marriage in 1964, he began a romantic relationship with heiress and socialite Marjorie Merriweather Post, daughter of breakfast-cereal magnate C. W. Post, twenty years his senior. He was a co-executor of Post's will. Part of her estate was her mansion on Palm Beach Island, Mar-a-Lago, purchased in 1980 by Donald Trump.

On August 23, 1980, he wed widowed Charlotte Brooks Williams. Korth died in September 1998 in El Paso, Texas and is buried under a three-century-old Texas Live Oak tree on his ranch in Karnes County, Texas.

His stepdaughter, Melissa Williams O'Rourke, is the mother of former U.S. Representative Beto O'Rourke.

See also

Suite 8F Group

References

External links

NameBase link (Archive )

1909 births
1998 deaths
United States Secretaries of the Navy
People from Yorktown, Texas